Babatpur railway station is one of the railway stations in Varanasi district. It is 5 km East of Lal Bahadur Shastri International Airport, 22 km North-West of Varanasi Junction railway station and 29 km North-West of Banaras Hindu University. It primarily serves the Pindra tehsil.

See also
Varanasi Junction railway station
Kerakat railway station

References 

Railway stations in Varanasi district
Lucknow NR railway division